Keklik Demir-Yücel (born 5 May 1968) is a Dutch politician of Turkish descent and former civil servant. As a member of the Labour Party (Partij van de Arbeid) she was an MP between 20 September 2012 and 23 March 2017. She focused on matters of emancipation, employment and (international) social work. Previously she was an MP in 2010, replacing Chantal Gill'ard. Till 2010, she worked for the local government in Deventer.

Yücel studied public administration at the Vrije Universiteit Amsterdam.

References

External links 
 
  Keklik Yücel at the website of the Labour Party
  Keklik Yücel at the website of House of Representatives

1968 births
21st-century Dutch politicians
Labour Party (Netherlands) politicians
Living people
Dutch people of Turkish descent
Members of the House of Representatives (Netherlands)
People from Deventer
Turkish emigrants to the Netherlands
Vrije Universiteit Amsterdam alumni
People from Akseki
21st-century Dutch women politicians
21st-century Dutch civil servants
20th-century Dutch civil servants
20th-century Dutch women